Beautiful Families is a 1964 Italian comedy film directed by Ugo Gregoretti and starring Annie Girardot.

Plot
The film's theme is four episodes in which it is offered to the public a glimpse into the lives of rich and poor families of Italy in the Sixties.

In the episode of Toto, the actor plays an old sick man who is assisted by his wife lovingly. This, however, has a relationship with the doctor of her husband. When both men, however, they discover that the woman betrays them with a third man, pretending to be seriously ill so that they do "assist" from wealthy woman.

Cast
 Annie Girardot - Maria (segment "Il principe azzurro")
 Jone Salinas - (segment "Il principe azzurro")
 Oreste Palella - (segment "Il principe azzurro")
 Maria Grazia Spadaro - (segment "Il principe azzurro")
 Angelo Infanti - (segment "Il principe azzurro")
 Susy Andersen - Carla (segment "Il bastardo della regina madre") (as Suzy Andersen)
 Nanni Loy - Uberto (segment "Il bastardo della regina madre")
 Hanil Ranieri - (segment "Il bastardo della regina madre")
 Totò - Filiberto Comanducci (segment "Amare è un po' morire")
 Sandra Milo - Esmeralda (segment "Amare è un po' morire")
 Jean Rochefort - Il marchese Osvaldo (segment "Amare è un po' morire")
 Adolfo Celi - Professore Della Porta (segment "Amare è un po' morire")
 Tony Anthony - Luigi (segment "La cernia")
 Susanna Clemm - Trude Muller (segment "La cernia")
 Lars Bloch - Muller (segment "La cernia")
 Maria Grazia Bon - Camilla (segment "La cernia")

References

External links

1964 films
French comedy films
1960s Italian-language films
Films directed by Ugo Gregoretti
Films scored by Armando Trovajoli
1964 comedy films
Italian comedy films
1960s Italian films
1960s French films